Al-Naba ( lit. The News or The Report) is an official weekly newspaper issued by the Central Media Office of the Islamic State, first published in 2014.

The first issue of the newspaper was published in May-June 2010, and on 17 October 2015 it started its activity as an official weekly newsletter.

With the defeat of ISIS in both Syria and Iraq, the newspaper temporarily stopped being published, although it resumed as the organisation regrouped.

See also
 Dabiq magazine
 Amaq News Agency

References

Weekly newspapers
Islamic newspapers
Arabic-language newspapers
Political newspapers
Publications established in 2014
Islamic State of Iraq and the Levant mass media
Propaganda newspapers and magazines